Christopher Cannon could refer to: 

Chris Cannon (born 1950), American politician
Christopher Cannon (medievalist) (born 1965), American academic
Christopher Michael Cannon (born 1993), American Electronic Music Publisher and Artist